Tuala Falenaoti Tiresa Malietoa (also known as Tiresa Malietoa) (8 February 1924 - 7 May 2016) was a Samoan politician and educator. She was leader of the Samoan Christian Party, and one of the first women to lead a Samoan political party.

She was the wife of Samoa's Head of State Malietoa Tanumafili II and a former principal of the Samoa Teachers Training College.

References

External links
An introduction about Samoan stories and legends by uala Falenaoti Tiresa Malietoa

1924 births
2016 deaths
Christian Party (Samoa) politicians
Samoan women in politics
21st-century women politicians